The Reserve Officer Training Corps (ROTC ( or )) is a group of college- and university-based officer-training programs for training commissioned officers of the United States Armed Forces.

Overview

While ROTC graduate officers serve in all branches of the U.S. military, the U.S. Marine Corps, the U.S. Space Force, and the U.S. Coast Guard do not have their own respective ROTC programs; rather, graduates of Naval ROTC programs have the option to serve as officers in the Marine Corps contingent on meeting Marine Corps requirements.

In 2020, ROTC graduates constituted 70 percent of newly commissioned active-duty U.S. Army officers, 83 percent of newly commissioned U.S. Marine Corps officers (through NROTC), 61 percent of newly commissioned U.S. Navy officers and 63 percent of newly commissioned U.S. Air Force officers, for a combined 56 percent of all active-duty officers in the Department of Defense commissioned that year. Under ROTC, a student may receive a competitive, merit-based scholarship covering all or part of college tuition, textbooks and lab fees, in return for an active-duty service obligation after graduation (or completion of a graduate degree under an approved education delay). ROTC students attend college like other students, but also receive basic military training and officer training for their chosen branch of service through the ROTC unit at or nearby the college. The students participate in regular drills during the school year and off-campus training opportunities during the summer.

Army ROTC units are organized as brigades, battalions and companies. Air Force ROTC units are detachments with the students organized into wings, groups, squadrons and flights. Army and Air Force ROTC students are referred to as cadets. Naval ROTC units are organized as battalions and also include NROTC students under "Marine Option" who will eventually be commissioned as officers in the Marine Corps. Marine NROTC students may be formed in a separate company when the program includes sufficient numbers. All Naval ROTC students are referred to as midshipmen. Some of the summer training that is offered to cadets in the Army ROTC program are: Airborne, Air Assault, Mountain Warfare, WHINSEC and other related schools. In addition to their mandatory pre-commissioning Field Training (FT) at Maxwell AFB, Alabama (4 weeks for 4-year program cadets; 6 weeks for 2-year program cadets), Air Force ROTC cadets are also eligible for Airborne training under the tutelage of the Army at Fort Benning, Georgia. Naval ROTC midshipmen will participate in summer cruise programs every summer, either afloat or ashore, similar to their U.S. Naval Academy midshipmen counterparts.

History

The concept of ROTC in the United States was created by Alden Partridge and began with the Morrill Act of 1862 which established the land-grant colleges. Part of the federal government's requirement for these schools was that they include military tactics as part of their curriculum, forming what became known as ROTC. The college from which ROTC originated is Norwich University in Northfield, Vermont. Norwich was founded in 1819 at Norwich, Vermont, as the American Literary, Scientific and Military Academy. The university was founded by former West Point instructor Captain Alden Partridge, who promoted the idea of a "citizen soldier"—a man trained to act in a military capacity when his nation required, but capable of fulfilling standard civilian functions in peacetime. This idea eventually led to the formation of Reservist and National Guard units with regimented training in place of local militia forces.

Another root of the modern ROTC program comes from the "Plattsburg Idea". In 1915, Major General Leonard Wood instituted the Citizen's Military Training Corps, the first series of training camps to make officers out of civilians. For the first time in history, an attempt was made to provide a condensed course of training and commissioning competent reserve line officers after only a summer of military training.

In 1916, the provision to formally establish ROTC was advocated to Congress by a delegation from Ohio including William Oxley Thompson, President of the Ohio State University.  On February 7, 1916, Ralph D. Mershon, a graduate of Ohio State, testified before the committee as a professional engineer.  Present to testify as an advocate of a Reserve Engineers Corps, he expanded his remarks to argue in favor of the "Ohio Plan."  Mershon noted:

 "... the transformation that will take place in one term of drill in a man just off the farm and very clumsy when he enters college, and who at the end of a term is 'set up', carries himself well, looks neat in his uniform, and has acquired a measure of self-respect, and the respect of his colleagues, to an extent he would not have had without the military training."

Congress agreed, and the ROTC provision was included in the final version of the National Defense Act of 1916. The first ROTC unit was at Harvard in 1916.

Over 5,000 men arrived at Plattsburgh in May 1917 for the first of the large training corps. By the end of 1917, over 17,000 men had been trained. By the eve of its entry into World War I, the U.S. had a prepared corps of officers including one of the earliest Plattsburgh graduates, Theodore Roosevelt Jr.

The National Defense Act of 1920 ramped up ROTC, and by 1928, units had been established at 225 colleges and universities. They were commissioning 6,000 second lieutenants per year.

During the 1930s, there were ROTC programs in some larger city high schools (Memphis, TN; Charlotte, NC; Kansas City, MO; New Orleans, LA).

Until the 1960s, many major universities required compulsory ROTC for all of their male students. However, because of the protests that culminated in the opposition to U.S. involvement in the Vietnam War, compulsory ROTC was dropped in favor of voluntary programs. In some places ROTC was expelled from campus altogether, although it was always possible to participate in off-campus ROTC.

As of 2021, more than 1,700 high schools have Junior Reserve Officers’ Training Corps (JROTC) programs.

In the 21st century, the debate often focused around the Congressional don't ask, don't tell law, signed into law by President Bill Clinton in 1993 and in force until 2011, which forbade homosexuals serving in the United States military from disclosing their sexual orientation at the risk of expulsion. Some schools believed this legal mandate would require them to waive or amend their non-discrimination policies.

In recent years, concerted efforts are being made at some Ivy League universities that have previously banned ROTC (including Columbia) to return ROTC to campus. The Harvard ROTC program was reinstated effective March 4, 2011 following enactment of the Don't Ask, Don't Tell Repeal Act of 2010.

Under current law, there are three types of ROTC programs administered, each with a different element.

 The first are the programs at the six senior military colleges, also known as military schools. These institutions grant baccalaureate degrees (at a minimum) and organize all or some of their students into a corps of cadets under some sort of military discipline. Those participating in the cadet program must attend at least 2 years of ROTC education.
 The second are programs at "civilian colleges". As defined under Army regulations, these are schools that grant baccalaureate or graduate degrees and are not operated on a military basis.
The third category is programs at military junior colleges (MJC). These are military schools that provide junior college education (typically A.S. or A.A. degree). These schools do not grant baccalaureate degrees but they meet all other requirements of military colleges (if participating in the Early Commissioning Program) and cadets are required to meet the same military standards as other schools (if enrolled in ECP), as set by Army Cadet Command. Cadets can be commissioned as second lieutenants in the Army Reserve/Army National Guard as graduating sophomores. Upon commissioning, these lieutenants are required to complete their bachelor's degree at another institution (of the lieutenant's choosing) while serving in their units. Upon receiving their bachelors, ECP lieutenants can assess active duty and go onto active duty as a first lieutenant. Only the Army currently offers an Early Commissioning Program. In time of war, MJC's have played a significant role in producing officers for the Army. During the Vietnam war, the requirement to complete one's bachelor's degree was not in effect. Therefore, upon commissioning lieutenants went straight onto active duty.

One difference between civilian colleges and the senior or junior military colleges is enrollment option in ROTC. ROTC is voluntary for students attending civilian colleges and universities. However, with few exceptions (as outlined in both Army regulations and federal law) it is required of students attending the senior and junior military colleges. Another major difference between the senior military colleges and civilian colleges is that under federal law, graduates of the SMCs are guaranteed active duty assignments if requested with the approval of the school's professor of military science.

U.S. Army ROTC

The Army Reserve Officer Training Corps (AROTC) program is the largest branch of ROTC, as the Army is the largest branch of the military. There are over 20,000 ROTC cadets in 273 ROTC programs at major universities throughout the United States. These schools are categorized as Military Colleges (MC), Military Junior Colleges (MJC) and Civilian Colleges (CC). Army ROTC provides the majority of the Army's officer corps; the remainder comes from West Point, Officer Candidate School (OCS), or direct commissions.

AROTC offers scholarships based on the time of enrollment in the program. Newly graduated seniors in high school can enter the program with a full four-year scholarship while college students can enroll later and earn a scholarship that would cover the remainder of their college career.

The two-year scholarship is available for students with two academic years of college remaining. An applicant for a two-year or four-year scholarship must meet the following requirements:
 U.S. citizen
 High school diploma or equivalent
 Between ages 17 and 27
 College GPA of at least 2.5
 Army physical fitness standard

The applicant must agree to accept a commission and serve in the Army on Active Duty or in a Reserve Component (U.S. Army Reserve or Army National Guard).

The four-year scholarship is for students who receive it out of high school or before entering college. The four-year scholarship can be extended with the same conditions to a 5-year scholarship if the major is in Engineering.

Campus-based three-year, two-and-a-half-year, and two-year scholarships are available for students already enrolled in a college or university with three (or two) academic years remaining.

An applicant for a campus-based scholarship must meet all AROTC administrative and academic requirements as well as have a minimum SAT score of 1000 or ACT score of 19.

Once a prospect has shown interest in the AROTC program they can compete in a scholarship board.  If the prospect boards well the AROTC program's Professor of Military Science may submit them for selection of a scholarship. Numerous factors will influence this decision.

Typically the summer between the academic junior and senior years of school, Cadets attend Advance Camp at Fort Knox, Kentucky. Here, each cadet would be evaluated on leadership skills. The course was set up for a month of training with other peers and evaluated by Army Officers and Non-Commissioned Officers. Advance Camp is the United States Army's largest training event.

U.S. Naval ROTC

The Naval Reserve Officer Training Corps (NROTC) program was founded in 1926 and the U.S. Marine Corps joined the program in 1932. The naval NROTC program is offered at over 150 colleges nationwide. The Nation's first Marine Corps oriented NROTC was established at The Citadel in 1970.

U.S. Air Force ROTC

The first Air Force Reserve Officer Training Corps (then Air ROTC) units were established between 1920 and 1923 at the University of California, Berkeley, the Georgia Institute of Technology, the University of Illinois, the University of Washington, the Massachusetts Institute of Technology and Texas A&M University. After World War II, the Air Force established ROTC units at 77 colleges and universities throughout the United States.

Non-U.S. ROTC programs
Other national armed forces in countries with strong historical ties to the United States have ROTC programs.
 ROTC in the Philippines began in 1912 during American territorial rule with the creation of the first unit at the University of the Philippines. The National ROTC Alumni Association (NRAA) of the Philippines estimates that 75 percent of the officer corps of the Armed Forces of the Philippines come from ROTC.
 ROTC in South Korea started in 1961.
 ROTC in Taiwan started in the 1960s with training courses being severely reduced over the years as an experiment before it was implemented again in 1997.

Other countries have also institutionalized reservist training programs. Reserve Officer Training in Russia began in the 1920s. Brazil has had the CPOR and the NPOR since 1928, the difference being that officers trained by the CPOR choose their area of specialization, while officers trained by the NPOR learn from their local army base.

Student Army Training Corps (SATC)
During World War I, the United States created the Student Army Training Corps in an effort to encourage young men to simultaneously receive a college education and train for the military. Students were authorized to participate beginning in the summer of 1917, and training camps were held in the summer of 1918.

Enrollment in the SATC was voluntary, and 525 universities enrolled 200,000 total students on October 1, 1918, the first day SATC units were authorized to formally organize on college campuses. Students who joined the SATC received the rank of private in the army, and some advanced to leadership roles including sergeant.

When the Armistice of November 11, 1918 ended the war, the Army's need for more soldiers and officers ended. The SATC was disbanded in December 1918, and its members were honorably discharged from the military.

Notable members
Individuals who served in the Student Army Training Corps included:

Frederick Van Ness Bradley, U.S. Representative
Wilburn Cartwright, U.S. Representative
Deane Davis, governor of Vermont
William O. Douglas, associate justice of the U.S. Supreme Court
Harold Earthman, U.S. Representative
Kenneth Keating, U.S. Senator and ambassador
F. Ray Keyser Sr., Associate Justice of the Vermont Supreme Court
Carl Mays, Major League Baseball pitcher
Claude Pepper, U.S. Senator and U.S. Representative
J. Ernest Wharton, U.S. Representative

See also

 Early Commissioning Program
 Army University
 Pershing Rifles
 Military Junior College
 United States Senior Military College
 United States Service academies
 Junior Reserve Officers' Training Corps (JROTC)
 Gold Bar Recruiter

References

Further reading
 Deborah D. Avant (2005) The Market for Force: The Consequences of Privatizing Security, Cambridge University Press.
 David Axe (2007) Army 101: Inside ROTC in a Time of War.
 Charles Johnson (2002) African Americans and ROTC: Military, Naval, and Aeroscience Programs at Historically Black Colleges 1916 — 1973.
 Betty J. Morden (1990) Women's Army Corps, p 287.
 Jennifer M. Silva, "ROTC", chapter 35 of Gender and Higher Education by Barbara J. Bank.
 Harlow G Unger (2007) Encyclopedia of American Education, p 938.
 David Atkinson (2012) Ultimate ROTC Guidebook, The: Tips, Tricks, and Tactics for Excelling in Reserve Officers' Training Corps.

External links

 U.S. Air Force ROTC
 U.S. Army ROTC
 U.S. Navy ROTC

 
1916 establishments in the United States
1916 in military history
National Defense Act of 1916
Student organizations established in 1916